The men's 20 kilometres was one of seven track cycling events on the Cycling at the 1908 Summer Olympics programme.  Its distance was the second longest of the individual event distances. Each nation could enter up to 12 cyclists.

Competition format

The 20 kilometres in 1908 was a unique race in Olympic history. It was in some ways like a very long sprint but with elements of a points race. Each race consisted of slightly over 33 laps of the 660 yard track. The time limit for the race was 40 minutes. The competition was held in two rounds (semifinals and a final). There were 6 semifinals. The winner of each semifinal advanced to the final, encouraging tactical riding similar to a sprint race despite the long distance. However, for the three fastest semifinals, the cyclist who led for the most laps would also advance. The final comprised 9 cyclists.

Results

Semifinals

There were two methods of qualifying for the final.  A cyclist could either finish first in one of the six semifinals or be the leader "of the greatest number of laps in the three fastest heats."

Semifinal 1

Flynn had a puncture at about the halfway mark.

Semifinal 2

Semifinal 3

Semifinal 4

Semifinal 5

Santorinaios and Texier crashed with half a lap remaining; Robertson was slowed by having to ride around them.

Semifinal 6

"With nine laps to go, Coeckelberg's tyre punctured, and two laps further on the Belgian was again unlucky. He left the track, cut across the grass, seized another machine, and remounted, but was disqualified."

Final

Meredith and Denny suffered punctures early on. Hansson fell near the end. Bonnet led most of the first half of the race. Kingsbury started his sprint shortly after the bell, "hotly challenged" by Jones, Werbrouck, and Weintz for "one of the most exciting finishes of the Games, which Kingsbury just won by three inches."

Notes

Sources
 
 De Wael, Herman. Herman's Full Olympians: "Cycling 1908". Accessed 7 April 2006.

Men's 020 kilometres
Track cycling at the 1908 Summer Olympics
Olympic track cycling events